Mittelweser may refer to the following places in northern Germany:

the central part of the river Weser
Middle Weser Valley
Middle Weser Region
Mittelweser (Samtgemeinde), a Samtgemeinde in the district of Nienburg